Heinrich Müller (14 November 1926 – 6 January 1997) was a Swiss cyclist. He competed in the 4,000 metres team pursuit event at the 1952 Summer Olympics.

References

External links
 

1926 births
1997 deaths
Swiss male cyclists
Olympic cyclists of Switzerland
Cyclists at the 1952 Summer Olympics
Cyclists from Zürich